Žabja Vas is a settlement on the right bank of the Poljane Sora River halfway between Poljane and Gorenja Vas in the Municipality of Gorenja Vas–Poljane in the Upper Carniola region of Slovenia.

References

External links

Žabja Vas on Geopedia

Populated places in the Municipality of Gorenja vas-Poljane